Stefan Erkinger (born September 1, 1981) is an Austrian professional association football player currently playing for SK Austria Klagenfurt. He plays as a midfielder.

References

1981 births
Living people
Austrian footballers
Association football midfielders
Grazer AK players
Kapfenberger SV players